Fun Taiwan is a long-running Taiwanese travel program hosted by Taiwanese-American Janet Hsieh and airing on Discovery's TLC Asia. It began production in 2005, and is currently in its 16th season. Past guests have included host Armando Reed of TLC's Armando's Asian Twist, Singapore-based television personality George Young, American-based television personality JJ Yosh, and Taiwan-based Turkish television personality Rifat Karlova.

The show has also expanded to include a reality show spin-off entitled Fun Taiwan Challenge.

Golden Bell Awards

Asian Television Awards

References

Taiwanese non-fiction television series
TLC (TV network) original programming
Travel television series